Miya may refer to:

Places in Japan 
 Mikawa-Miya Station in Aichi
 Miya, Gifu
 Miya-juku, one of the stations of the Tōkaidō
 Miya River (Mie)
 Miya River, a river known as the Jinzū River after if flows from Gifu to Toyama Prefecture

People

People from Japan 
 Miya (born 1979), musician and guitarist of rock band Mucc
 Miya (born Haruka Miyauchi, 1995), singer and member of South Korean girl group GWSN
 Miya Sato (born 1986), volleyball player
 Miya Serizono, voice actress
 Miya Tachibana (born 1974), Olympic silver medalist in synchronized swimming
, Japanese footballer
 Shiro Miya (1943–2012), enka singer
 Miya Cech (born 2007), American actress

People from elsewhere 
 Miya (actress) (born 1992), Indian actress
 Miya Ando, artist
 Miya Folick, American musician
 Miya Hisaka Silva, Founder/Director of El Teatro de Danza Contemporanea de El Salvador
 Miya Masaoka (born 1958), Japanese-American musician and composer
 Miya Muqi (born 1987), Chinese actress
 Farouk Miya (born 1997), Ugandan footballer
 Hasina Miya, Nepalese politician
 Sadrul Miya Haque, Nepalese politician
 Salim Miya Ansari, Nepalese politician

Fictional characters 
 Atsumu Miya, a character in the anime series Haikyuu!!
Osamu Miya, a character in the anime series Haikyuu!!
Miya Shimada, name of comic book character Tsunami (DC Comics)
 Miya Fuski, a fictional character created by Jivram Joshi for children's literature in Gujarati
, a character in the anime series Gatchaman Crowds
Miya Chinen, a character in the anime series Sk8 the Infinity

Other uses 
 Crocidura miya, also known as the Sri Lankan Long-tailed Shrew
 Fushimi-no-miya, the oldest branch of the Japanese Imperial Family
 Miya people East Bengal Rooted an ethnic group in Assam, India
 Na Asamiya, an ethnic group in Assam, India
 Miya language, a language in Nigeria
 Miya's, a restaurant

Japanese feminine given names
Japanese-language surnames